Marjan Živković (Serbian Cyrillic: Марјан Живковић; born 21 May 1973) is a Serbian former professional footballer who played as a midfielder.

Honours
Obilić
 First League of FR Yugoslavia: 1997–98
 FR Yugoslavia Cup: Runner-up 1994–95, 1997–98

External links

References

1973 births
Living people
People from Pirot
Association football midfielders
Serbia and Montenegro footballers
Serbian footballers
FK Radnički Pirot players
FK Mogren players
Red Star Belgrade footballers
FK Radnički Niš players
PFC Litex Lovech players
FK Železnik players
OFK Beograd players
Nanjing Yoyo players
FK Hajduk Beograd players
First League of Serbia and Montenegro players
First Professional Football League (Bulgaria) players
Serbia and Montenegro expatriate footballers
Expatriate footballers in Bulgaria
Serbia and Montenegro expatriate sportspeople in Bulgaria
Expatriate footballers in China
Serbia and Montenegro expatriate sportspeople in China
Serbian football managers
FK Radnički Pirot managers
FK Obilić managers
FK Novi Pazar managers
FK Belasica managers
Serbian expatriate football managers
Serbian expatriate sportspeople in China
Expatriate football managers in China
Serbian expatriate sportspeople in North Macedonia
Expatriate football managers in North Macedonia
Al-Shabab SC (Kuwait) managers
Kuwait Premier League managers
Serbian expatriate sportspeople in Kuwait
Expatriate football managers in Kuwait